Trepassey Bay is a bay that is  wide, located on the northeast side of the Tabarin Peninsula,  south-southeast of the Hope Bay, in the extreme northeast of the Antarctic Peninsula.
It was first surveyed by the Falklands Islands Dependencies Survey (FIDS) and by E. Burden, Master of the Trepassey, from that vessel in 1947. The FIDS resurveyed the bay in 1955.

The bay was named by the UK Antarctic Place-Names Committee (UK-APC) for the vessel which was used for the relief of the station at Hope Bay in 1946-47 seasons and for a survey of Antarctic Sound during the second season.

References 

Bays of Trinity Peninsula